Marius Zobel (born 18 November 1999) is a German swimmer.

He competed in the  mixed freestyle relay event at the 2018 European Aquatics Championships, winning the gold medal.

References

1999 births
Living people
German male swimmers
German male freestyle swimmers
European Aquatics Championships medalists in swimming
20th-century German people
21st-century German people